The desert spadefoot toad (Notaden nichollsi) is a species of frog in the family Limnodynastidae.
It is endemic to Australia.
Its natural habitats are subtropical or tropical dry shrubland, subtropical or tropical dry lowland grassland, intermittent freshwater marshes, hot deserts, and temperate desert.

References

Notaden
Amphibians of South Australia
Amphibians of Queensland
Amphibians of the Northern Territory
Amphibians of Western Australia
Amphibians described in 1940
Taxonomy articles created by Polbot
Frogs of Australia